The Old Dairy Farm Depot, or Old Dairy Farm Building, is a building in Central, Hong Kong, which currently houses the Hong Kong Fringe Club (South Block) and the Foreign Correspondents' Club (North Block). It is located at 2 Lower Albert Road. The back of the building is located along Wyndham Street, while its edge faces Glenealy.

History
In 1892, Dairy Farm built a low-rise brick and stucco building on Lower Albert Road in Central for use as a cold storage warehouse. It was designed by Danby & Leigh (now Leigh & Orange). The original depot only comprised about half (the southern part) of the present premises. This warehouse was later renovated and expanded in 1913, 1917 and 1925 to include a dairy shop, a room for meat smoking, a cold storage room for winter clothes and residency for the general manager. The building later evolved into the company headquarters until the company moved in the 1970s.

The Foreign Correspondents' Club started occupying the North Block in 1982. The South Block has been leased by the Hong Kong Fringe Club since 1984. It has undergone many major renovations since the Fringe Club moved in.

Architecture
The building is built in the Eclectic architectural style with strong Neoclassical and some Arts and Crafts influence. The facade features polychromatic "bandaged" brickworks.

Conservation
The building is located along the Central and Western Heritage Trail. It was listed as a Grade II historic building in 1981, and as a Grade I historic building in 2009. The project of renovation and refurbishment of the Old Dairy Farm Building and its conversion into the Hong Kong Fringe Club was a winner of the 2001 Hong Kong Heritage Awards, organised by the Antiquities Advisory Board and the Antiquities and Monuments Office.

References

Central, Hong Kong
Grade I historic buildings in Hong Kong
Commercial buildings completed in 1890